Wustrow is a town in the Lüchow-Dannenberg district, in Lower Saxony, Germany. It is part of the Samtgemeinde ("collective municipality") Lüchow.

Geography

Location 
Wustrow is situated five kilometers (3 mi) south of the city Lüchow and eight kilometers (5 mi) north of Salzwedel.

The River Jeetzel flows through the town and north of the town flows the River Wustrower Dumme into the Jeetzel.

Subdivions 
The town consists of the following subdivisions:

Local council

The elections in September 2013 showed the following results:
Bunte Liste Wustrow (Coloured list Wustrow) - 4 seats
CDU - 4 seats
SPD - 3 seats
Bürger statt Bürokratie (Citizens instead of bureaucracy) 2 seats

References

Lüchow-Dannenberg